American Psycho is a 2000 satirical horror film directed by Mary Harron, who co-wrote the screenplay with Guinevere Turner. Based on the 1991 novel by Bret Easton Ellis, it stars Christian Bale as Patrick Bateman, a New York City investment banker who leads a double life as a serial killer. Willem Dafoe, Jared Leto, Josh Lucas, Chloë Sevigny, Samantha Mathis, Cara Seymour, Justin Theroux, and Reese Witherspoon appear in supporting roles. The film blends horror and black comedy to satirize 1980s yuppie culture and consumerism, exemplified by Bateman.

Ellis considered his controversial novel unfilmable, but producer Edward R. Pressman was determined to adapt it and bought the film rights in 1992. Stuart Gordon, David Cronenberg, and Rob Weiss considered directing the film before Harron and Turner began writing the screenplay in 1996. They sought to make a 1980s period film that emphasized the novel's satire. The pre-production period was tumultuous; Harron chose Bale to play Bateman, but because distributor Lions Gate Films sought Leonardo DiCaprio in the role, Harron was fired and replaced with Oliver Stone. After Stone and DiCaprio left due to creative differences, Harron was rehired and allowed to cast Bale. Principal photography began in February 1999 in Toronto and New York City.

American Psycho premiered at the Sundance Film Festival on January 21, 2000, and was theatrically released in the United States on April 14. The film received mostly positive reviews, with praise for Bale's performance and the screenplay, and grossed over $34 million on a $7 million budget. It has since developed a cult following and a strong presence in contemporary meme culture. A direct-to-video sequel, American Psycho 2, was released in 2002, although it has little relation to the original.

Plot
In 1987, Patrick Bateman, a young and wealthy New York City investment banker, spends most of his time dining at popular restaurants while keeping up appearances for his fiancée Evelyn Williams and his circle of wealthy associates, most of whom he hates. At a business meeting, Bateman and his associates flaunt their business cards, focusing on their design and style. Enraged by the superiority of his colleague Paul Allen's card, Bateman finds a homeless man and his dog in an alley at night and kills them. Bateman and Allen, who mistakes Bateman for another co-worker, make plans for dinner after a Christmas party. Bateman resents Allen for his affluent lifestyle and ability to obtain reservations at Dorsia, an exclusive restaurant. He gets Allen drunk, lures him to his apartment and kills him with an axe while listening to Huey Lewis and the News. Bateman disposes of the body and goes into Allen's apartment to leave a message on his answering machine claiming that Allen has gone to London.

Private investigator Donald Kimball interviews Bateman regarding Allen's disappearance, mentioning that Allen may have been seen in London. Bateman invites two prostitutes, Christie and Sabrina, over to his apartment, where they have sex. He tortures them, pays them, and sends them on their way. Bateman's colleague Luis Carruthers reveals a new business card, so Bateman tries to strangle him in the restroom of an expensive restaurant. Carruthers mistakes the attempt for a sexual advance and declares his desire for Bateman, who panics and flees. Kimball conducts a second interview with Bateman, who then murders a model and puts her severed head in his freezer. The next day he invites his secretary Jean to dinner, suggesting that she meet him at his apartment for drinks. Bateman is about to kill her with a nail gun when he receives a message from Evelyn on his answering machine and desists.

Bateman has lunch with Kimball, who reveals that a colleague of Bateman claims to have had dinner with him on the day of Allen's disappearance, cementing his alibi. Kimball remarks that the idea of one of Allen's friends murdering him for no reason is simply not believable, to which Bateman nervously smiles. Bateman brings Christie to Allen's apartment, where he drugs his acquaintance Elizabeth before having sex with her and Christie. When Bateman kills Elizabeth, Christie runs, discovering several female corpses as she searches for an exit. A naked Bateman chases her and drops a running chainsaw on her as she flees down a stairwell. Soon after, Bateman breaks off his engagement with Evelyn.

As Bateman uses an ATM, he sees a cat. The ATM displays the text "FEED ME A STRAY CAT", so he prepares to shoot the cat. When a woman confronts him, he instead shoots her. A police chase ensues, but Bateman shoots one of the officers and blows up a patrol car, killing the other policemen. Bateman next kills a security guard and a janitor before hiding in his office. He calls his lawyer Harold Carnes and frantically leaves a confession on his answering machine, claiming to have killed 20–40 people and eaten some of them. The following morning, Bateman visits Allen's apartment to clean it, but he finds it vacant and for sale. A realtor cryptically tells him that the apartment does not belong to Allen before asking him to leave and not come back.

In a state of hysteria, Bateman calls Jean, then goes to meet with his colleagues for lunch. Meanwhile, Jean finds detailed, graphic drawings of murder and mutilation in Bateman's office journal. Bateman sees Carnes and mentions the phone message. Carnes mistakes Bateman for another man and laughs off the confession as a joke. Bateman clarifies who he is and again confesses the murders, but Carnes says his claims are impossible since he recently had dinner with Allen in London. A confused Bateman returns to his friends; they discuss dinner reservations and muse about whether Ronald Reagan is a harmless old man or a hidden psychopath. Bateman, unsure if his crimes were real or imaginary, realizes he will never receive the punishment he desires. His narration declares that he is in constant pain, that he wishes his pain inflicted on others, and that his confession means nothing.

Cast

 Christian Bale as Patrick Bateman, a New York City investment banker who leads a double life as a serial killer
 Justin Theroux as Timothy Bryce, a colleague of Bateman
 Josh Lucas as Craig McDermott, a colleague of Bateman
 Bill Sage as David Van Patten, a colleague of Bateman
 Chloë Sevigny as Jean, Bateman's secretary
 Reese Witherspoon as Evelyn Williams, Bateman's fiancée whom he despises
 Samantha Mathis as Courtney Rawlinson, Luis Carruthers' fiancée who is having an affair with Bateman
 Matt Ross as Luis Carruthers, a colleague of Bateman and closeted homosexual
 Jared Leto as Paul Allen, a fellow investment banker whom Bateman kills
 Willem Dafoe as Donald Kimball, a private investigator who investigates the murder of Paul Allen
 Cara Seymour as Christie, a prostitute
 Guinevere Turner as Elizabeth, a woman whom Bateman kills

Other cast members include Stephen Bogaert as Harold Carnes, Bateman's lawyer; Reg E. Cathey as Al, a homeless man; Krista Sutton as Sabrina, a prostitute; Catherine Black as Vanden, Williams' cousin; Patricia Gage as Mrs. Wolfe, a real estate agent; and Anthony Lemke as Marcus Halberstram, Bateman's colleague. Former U.S. president Ronald Reagan appears in archive footage of his 1987 address concerning the Iran–Contra affair.

Production

Early development 

The film is an adaptation of the satirical novel American Psycho by Bret Easton Ellis, which was published in 1991 amid significant controversy over its graphic depiction of violence against women. Ellis had been disappointed by the 1987 adaptation of his first novel, Less than Zero (1985), and did not expect that anyone would be interested in adapting American Psycho, which he considered possibly unfilmable. Nonetheless, development of a film adaptation began in 1992, after Johnny Depp expressed interest and producer Edward R. Pressman bought the film rights. Pressman, to Ellis' surprise, was "obsessed" with turning American Psycho into a film. Ellis discussed the project with filmmaker Stuart Gordon but felt that he was unsuitable.

David Cronenberg and Brad Pitt respectively became attached to direct and star, and Ellis was brought on to write the screenplay. The process was difficult for Ellis; Cronenberg did not want to use any of the restaurant or nightclub material from the novel (which he considered boring), wanted to excise the violence, and mandated that the script be 65–70 pages. Ellis considered Cronenberg's directions "insane" and ignored them. Ellis' draft departed significantly from the novel, as he had "been living with it for, like, three and a half years, four years" and had grown bored with it. It ended with an elaborate musical sequence to Barry Manilow's "Daybreak" atop the World Trade Center, a change which Ellis felt exemplified how bored he was with the material.

The development was prolonged due to what Variety called American Psycho "literary complexity", which made adapting it to film difficult. Cronenberg was dissatisfied with Ellis' draft and by March 1994 had sought a new draft from Norman Snider; Ellis later recalled that Cronenberg left the project after he disliked Snider's draft even more. Ellis wrote another draft for Rob Weiss in 1995, but the film again failed to materialize. Pressman did not want to make a film that would offend people and described Ellis' draft as "completely pornographic". Pressman appeared at the 1996 Cannes Film Festival to pre-sell the distribution rights to no avail.

Development under Mary Harron 
After her film I Shot Andy Warhol premiered at the 49th Cannes Film Festival to positive reviews in January 1996, Mary Harron received a call from Roberta Hanley—who operated the production company which held the American Psycho film rights—with an offer to direct the film. Harron had attempted to read the novel when it was originally published, but found it too violent. However, rereading it, she realized that "just enough time ha[d] passed" to produce a period film set in the 1980s, "bring out the satire", and comment on the era, which interested her. Harron was ambivalent towards the other "very mainstream and boring" offers she was receiving following I Shot Andy Warhol and decided to make American Psycho due to its "risky" nature.

Harron read the existing drafts; while she somewhat enjoyed Ellis', she felt that most were too moralistic, missing the novel's preciseness in depicting social privilege. Harron told Pressman that she would join the project only if she could write her own screenplay. Pressman commented that out of all the directors who attached themselves to American Psycho, Harron was "the only person who actually ever conveyed a clear solution as to how to do it". Harron recruited Guinevere Turner, who she had been working with on what would become The Notorious Bettie Page (2005), to co-write. Turner was not a horror fan and had never heard of American Psycho, but Harron convinced her that it would be a good project to pursue. Though she found the novel unsavory, Turner appreciated its blend of humor and horror and concluded that "with the right spin it could be a really subversive, feminist movie".

Harron and Turner excised most of the novel's violence outside four sequences of Bateman's murders. Their approach to the material and Bateman's character was influenced by Mario Bava's giallo film Hatchet for the Honeymoon (1970), with Bava historian Tim Lucas noting that both films feature protagonists motivated by a desire for self-discovery in their killings. Harron recalled facing scrutiny for depicting Bateman as homophobic—a criticism she found odd, since no objections were raised over his murders. She also received requests to delve into Bateman's psychology, but said that "having a very clear psychological explanation [wasn't] of great interest to me" since she found the concept generic, shallow, and unrealistic. Harron rejected suggestions to explore Bateman's family and background; she felt it was unnecessary and that Bateman was simply "a monster".

Harron met with several actors for the role of Patrick Bateman, but struggled to find a suitable candidate. She noted that "if someone isn't 100 percent on a role like [Bateman], you can't cast them and they shouldn't do it". Billy Crudup was attached to the role for a month and a half, but was uneasy and left the project. Turner appreciated Crudup's honesty in admitting he could not understand the character. Harron sent the script to Christian Bale, but he had never read American Psycho and thus had no interest. Harron contacted Christine Vachon, who was working with Bale on Velvet Goldmine (1998) at the time, and Vachon told him to read the script. Bale found the script humorous and immediately became interested, and flew to New York to audition in Harron's living room.

Bale struggled to speak in an American accent since he had been speaking in a Manchester accent for Velvet Goldmine, but Harron thought it was clear he understood the role. Like Harron, Bale was uninterested in Bateman's backstory; he saw the character as "an alien who landed in the unabashedly capitalist New York of the '80s". Harron felt he was the only one who fit the role, later saying he "saw the part the way that I did, and he got the humor of it". When auditioning others she "had the feeling a lot of the other actors kind of thought Bateman was cool". Bale, she said though, did not. Harron thought casting the relatively unknown Bale was risky, but "had a lot of faith in him", as Velvet Goldmine director Todd Haynes told her that Bale was "the best actor I've ever worked with". Harron and Bale, in-character as Bateman, met with Ellis for dinner, an experience Ellis said was "unnerving" since it was the first time he had met "someone pretending to be this monster that I created".

Pre-production and casting 

Lions Gate Films acquired the American Psycho distribution rights in May 1998 and set a budget of $10 million. Harron and Bale were planning to begin filming the following August and though no actors were signed on yet, Willem Dafoe and Jared Leto had expressed interest in joining. Harron suggested that the slim Bale go to a gym since Bateman frequently exercises; she said that within two weeks, Bale had "totally transformed". Turner said Bale "became completely ripped, super tan, got his teeth turned into perfect American teeth. I think he said he was modeling himself after his lawyer, or his agent, or Tom Cruise — an amalgam of those". Bale received numerous warnings that starring in American Psycho was "career suicide", but this only made him more committed.

Bale was relatively unknown at the time; he was only 13 at the time of his then-most famous role, in Steven Spielberg's Empire of the Sun (1987). Lions Gate did not want to cast him and pushed for a more famous star like Edward Norton or Leonardo DiCaprio, who Lions Gate was willing to pay $20 million (although the budget for the film itself would remain only $6 million). DiCaprio was considered the biggest star in the world at the time (having just starred in Titanic (1997), then the highest-grossing film ever) and was interested in playing Bateman, but Harron opposed casting him, comparing the prospect to Demi Moore's casting in the critically panned 1995 Scarlet Letter film. She argued he was too boyish to play Bateman and that his presence would harm the film given his young female fanbase. Harron refused to even consider meeting with him, despite Pressman's pleas. Ellis did not mind the idea of DiCaprio as Bateman, though he knew this annoyed Bale and Harron.

At the 51st Cannes Film Festival in May 1998, Lions Gate suddenly announced that DiCaprio had been cast as Bateman. Though Pressman wanted Harron to stay, Harron was fired after making it clear that she would not direct American Psycho without Bale. Furthermore, DiCaprio wanted to work with a major director and had drafted a shortlist that included Danny Boyle, Stanley Kubrick, and Martin Scorsese. Oliver Stone was hired to direct and, after a reading with DiCaprio, Leto, and Cameron Diaz, began reworking the script. Stone and DiCaprio wanted to take the film in a more psychological direction in contrast to Harron's satire and turn it into a Jekyll and Hyde-like story. Their endeavor was beset by creative differences; Pressman said, "[DiCaprio] was looking for solutions to things that weren't problems... As time went on more and more questions came into Leo's mind — which might have been about the script or other factors". Bale was so confident DiCaprio would depart that he turned down other roles for nine months and continued preparing.

DiCaprio departed in favor of Danny Boyle's The Beach (2000), which led to Stone's withdrawal. Turner later said she heard from a friend that DiCaprio chose to leave after Gloria Steinem, a strong critic of the novel, convinced him to abandon the project due to his young fanbase. Lions Gate rehired Harron, but was still against casting Bale as Bateman. Lions Gate offered the role to Ewan McGregor, who turned it down after Bale personally urged him to do so. Harron spoke with Ben Affleck, Matt Damon, Norton, and Vince Vaughn, but after they all declined, Lions Gate begrudgingly agreed to hire Bale with a small $50,000 salary. Lions Gate also mandated that the budget not exceed $10 million and that recognizable actors would fill the supporting roles. By that point, Dafoe, Leto, Reese Witherspoon, and Chloë Sevigny were already committed; Harron and Bale unsuccessfully tried to convince Winona Ryder to play Evelyn Williams.

Filming 
Principal photography commenced on February 28, 1999, and lasted seven weeks, with a budget of $7 million. Andrzej Sekuła served as cinematographer; he and Harron frequently argued, with Ross recalling that "[Sekula] was setting up shots that in [Harron]'s mind may have been cool shots, pretty shots, but didn't tell the story she wanted to". As American companies did not want to be associated with American Psycho, the production team had to turn to European companies for clothes and cosmetics, though these still imposed restrictions. Rolex made Harron change the novel's line "don't touch the Rolex" to "don't touch the watch", while Cerruti 1881 disallowed Bale from wearing its clothes during the murder scenes.

Though some outdoor shots were captured in New York City (where the film is set), the majority of filming took place in downtown Toronto, with a variety of scenes shot in bars and restaurants around the city. Anti-violence advocates petitioned Toronto City Hall to deny the production permission to film in Toronto and organized protests because of reports that Paul Bernardo—who committed serial murders and rapes in Toronto—owned a copy of the novel. As a result, the production faced difficulty securing shooting locations; the scenes in Bateman's office had to be filmed on a sound stage because the owners of the building that Harron intended to film in feared negative publicity. Harron had been unaware of the novel's connection to the Bernardo case and sympathized with the protesters, but reasoned that she did not "want to put horrible mayhem on the screen... there's something to do here that hasn't really been done, a portrait of the late 80's that's worth putting on the screen". To avoid protests, the production removed the title from daily call sheets and parking permits.

Bale brought his copy of the novel to the set every day. Harron remained faithful to the novel's dialogue, so he "would kind of be skimming through it and looking at it and finding little bits and conferring in the corner with [her]". Bale drew inspiration from Nicolas Cage's performance in Vampire's Kiss (1989) and Tom Cruise in an interview on Late Night with David Letterman. He kept images of 1980s figures who he felt Bateman would attempt to emulate, such as Cruise and Donald Trump, in his trailer. A Method actor, Bale never broke character during the shoot—he did not socialize off-camera, always spoke with an American accent, and worked out at a gym for hours to maintain Bateman's physique. His behavior confused other actors, with Sevigny saying that she had never seen an actor commit to a role to such a degree. Josh Lucas later told Bale that the other actors "thought that [he] was the worst actor they'd ever seen" and did not understand why Harron fought for him. Harron nicknamed Bale "Robo-Actor" for his ability to control his sweat glands, which she and his co-stars noticed during the business card scene.

Harron and Bale excluded Leto from rehearsals of the murder of Paul Allen so Leto's expression of shock when Bale ran at him with an axe would be genuine. The shots of Bateman swinging his axe at Allen had to be done quickly since the scene's use of theatrical blood limited the number of takes. Bale swung at a Plexiglass-coated camera as the crew squirted fake blood at his face. The blood covered only half of Bale's face by accident, but Harron found this "a perfect metaphor for the Jekyll-and-Hyde aspect of Bateman: pristine on the outside, bloody and psychotic on the inside". Bale improvised Bateman's moonwalk, a change from the novel that Ellis initially disliked, but grew to appreciate over time. For the subsequent interview scenes featuring Donald Kimball, Harron shot three takes and requested that Dafoe act differently in each of them. Dafoe acted as if Kimball knew Bateman was Allen's killer in the first, only suspected him in the second, and did not suspect anything in the third. The three takes were then blended in post-production to confuse audiences.

Harron and Turner kept most violence off-screen, but Harron wanted "one classic horror movie scary scene" with "a big explosion of violence" that embraced the novel's brutality. They conceived a threesome with Bateman and two women that ends with him murdering them. Bale had no problem appearing nude, though he wore sneakers and covered his penis with a sock. One of the women was portrayed by Turner, who found it "very daunting" being directed by Harron, despite having been her co-writer for years. The shot in which Bateman murders Turner's character while having sex with her took several takes, as it was difficult to get the theatrical blood to ooze through the sheets as they intended. Bateman's phone confession took around 15 takes because Harron felt Bale's acting got better as he became more flushed. In contrast, a shot in which Bateman peels off a facial mask took only one take.

Music 

American Psycho soundtrack features licensed 1980s pop music from a variety of artists, including David Bowie, Phil Collins, the Cure, the Mediæval Bæbes, New Order, and Eric B. & Rakim. Due to the film's controversial nature, obtaining the rights proved difficult. Though the production was able to obtain the rights to all necessary songs, Whitney Houston refused to allow the use of her performance of "The Greatest Love of All", so an orchestral arrangement had to be used instead. The Huey Lewis and the News song "Hip to Be Square" appears in the film and was intended to be on the soundtrack album, but was removed, forcing Koch Records to recall approximately 100,000 copies. Koch Records president Bob Frank said that the removal was due to Huey Lewis objecting to the film's violence, but in 2013, Lewis said Frank's story was "completely made up". Lewis's manager Bob Brown said that "Hip to Be Square" was included on the album without their permission, which he speculated was a publicity stunt.

The original score was composed by Welsh musician and Velvet Underground co-founder John Cale, who also scored I Shot Andy Warhol, alongside M.J. Mynarski. Cale joined because, like I Shot Andy Warhol, he found Harron's script intelligent. He composed in his studio using a sampler and sent the music file to someone who turned it into a composition and hired musicians to record it. Harron described Cale's work as "a soulful, even melancholy sound to complement the soundtrack's poppy brightness". Cale was uninvolved with the selection of licensed music and sound mixing, though for one scene that Harron wanted to be unsettling, he suggested using animal noises, like the tapes of rabbits screaming that the Federal Bureau of Investigation used against the Branch Davidians during the Waco siege. The soundtrack album was released on April 4, 2000.

Release
As promotion, one could register to receive e-mails "from" Patrick Bateman, supposedly to his therapist. The e-mails, written by a writer attached to the film and approved by the book's author Bret Easton Ellis, follow Bateman's life since the events of the film. He discusses such developments as his marriage to (and impending divorce settlement with) his former secretary, Jean, his complete adoration of his son, Patrick Jr., and his efforts to triumph over his business rivals. The e-mails also describe or mention interactions with other characters from the novel, including Timothy Price (Bryce in the film version), Evelyn, Luis, Courtney, David, Detective Kimball, and Marcus. However, the film's star, Christian Bale, was not happy with this kind of marketing: "My main objection is that some people think it will be me returning those e-mails. I don't like that ... I think the movie stands on its own merits and should attract an audience that can appreciate intelligent satire. It's not a slasher flick, but it's also not American Pie. The marketing should reflect that".

Lionsgate spent $51,000 on an online stock market game, Make a Killing with American Psycho, which invited players to invest in films, actors, or musicians using fake Hollywood money. This marketing ploy did little to help the film's box office but the studio's co-president Tom Ortenberg still claimed that it was a success: "The aim was to gain exposure and awareness for the picture, and we did that. Lionsgate will make a tidy profit on the picture".

American Psycho premiered at the 2000 Sundance Film Festival. The Motion Picture Association of America (MPAA) initially gave the film an NC-17 rating for a scene featuring Bateman having a threesome with two prostitutes. The producers excised approximately 18 seconds of footage to obtain an R-rated version of the film.

Home media
A special-edition DVD was released on July 21, 2005. In the U.S., two versions of the film have been released: an R-rated and unrated version. For the edited version and R-rated cinematic release in the U.S., the producers excised about 18 seconds of footage from a scene featuring Bateman having a threesome with two prostitutes. Some dialogue was also edited: Bateman orders a prostitute, Christie, to bend over so that another, Sabrina, can "see your asshole", which was edited to "see your ass". The unedited version also shows Bateman receiving oral sex from Christie. The uncut version was released on Blu-ray on February 6, 2007. A 4K Blu-ray was released with the Uncut Version on September 25, 2018 in US and October 15 in United Kingdom. Sony Pictures Home Entertainment also released the film on Blu-ray around Australia, Spain, Poland, Russia, South Africa, Bulgaria, China, the Czech Republic, Hungary, Portugal, Thailand, and Taiwan in December 2008.

Reception
American Psycho debuted at the Sundance Film Festival, where it polarized audiences and critics; some praised the film for its writing and performance from Christian Bale, others with criticism for its violent nature. Upon its theatrical release, the film received positive reviews in crucial publications, including The New York Times which called it a "mean and lean horror comedy classic". On Rotten Tomatoes, the film has an approval rating of 68% based on 152 reviews, with an average rating of 6.3/10. The website's critical consensus reads: "If it falls short of the deadly satire of Bret Easton Ellis's novel, American Psycho still finds its own blend of horror and humor, thanks in part to a fittingly creepy performance by Christian Bale". Metacritic, which uses a weighted average, assigned the film a score of 64 out of 100, based on 35 critics, indicating "generally favorable reviews". Audiences polled by CinemaScore gave the film an average grade of "D" on an A+ to F scale. 

Roger Ebert gave the film three out of four stars and regarded Christian Bale as being "heroic in the way he allows the character to leap joyfully into despicability; there is no instinct for self-preservation here, and that is one mark of a good actor". In his review for the Los Angeles Times, Kenneth Turan wrote: "The difficult truth is that the more viewers can model themselves after protagonist Bateman, the more they can distance themselves from the human reality of the slick violence that fills the screen and take it all as some kind of a cool joke, the more they are likely to enjoy this stillborn, pointless piece of work". Newsweek magazine's David Ansen wrote: "But after an hour of dissecting the '80s culture of materialism, narcissism and greed, the movie begins to repeat itself. It becomes more grisly and surreal, but not more interesting". In his review for The Village Voice, J. Hoberman wrote: "If anything, Bale is too knowing. He eagerly works within the constraints of the quotation marks Harron puts around his performance".

Rolling Stones Peter Travers wrote: "Whenever Harron digs beneath the glitzy surface in search of feelings that haven't been desensitized, the horrific and hilarious American Psycho can still strike a raw nerve". In a somewhat positive review for Slate magazine, David Edelstein noted the toned-down brutality and sexual content in comparison to the novel and wrote that the moment where Bateman spares his secretary is when "this one-dimensional film blossoms like a flower". Owen Gleiberman gave the film an "A−" rating, writing for Entertainment Weekly: "By treating the book as raw material for an exuberantly perverse exercise in '80s Nostalgia, Harron recasts the go-go years as a template for the casually brainwashing-consumer/fashion/image culture that emerged from them. She has made a movie that is really a parable of today". Time magazine's Richard Corliss wrote that "Harron and co-screenwriter Guinevere Turner do understand the book, and they want their film to be understood as a period comedy of manners". A.O. Scott (also from The New York Times) praised the film as well.

Bloody Disgusting ranked the film at No. 19 in its list of the "Top 20 Horror Films of the Decade", with the article praising "Christian Bale's disturbing/darkly hilarious turn as serial killer/Manhattan businessman Patrick Bateman, a role that in hindsight couldn't have been played by any other actor. ... At its best, the film reflects our own narcissism, and the shallow American culture it was spawned from, with piercing effectiveness. Much of the credit for this can go to director Mary Harron, whose off-kilter tendencies are a good complement to Ellis's unique style".

Original author Ellis said, "American Psycho was a book I didn't think needed to be turned into a movie", as "the medium of film demands answers", which would make the book "infinitely less interesting". He also said that while the book attempted to add ambiguity to the events and to Bateman's reliability as a narrator, the film appeared to make them completely literal before confusing the issue at the very end. On a 2014 appearance on the WTF with Marc Maron podcast, Ellis indicated that his feelings towards the film were more mixed than negative; he reiterated his opinion that his conception of Bateman as an unreliable narrator did not make an entirely successful transition from page to screen, adding that Bateman's narration was so unreliable that even he, as the author of the book, didn't know if Bateman was honestly describing events that actually happened or if he was lying or even hallucinating. Ellis appreciated that the film clarified the humor for audiences who mistook the novel's violence for blatant misogyny as opposed to the deliberately exaggerated satire he'd intended, and liked that it gave his novel "a second life" in introducing it to new readers. Ultimately, Ellis said "the movie was okay, the movie was fine. I just didn't think it needed to be made".

Since the mid 2000s, the film has attracted a sizeable cult following, which has grown in the 2010s due to various social media platforms.

Legacy

Sequel 
A direct-to-video sequel, American Psycho 2, directed by Morgan J. Freeman and starring Mila Kunis, was released in 2002. The sequel's only connection with the original is the death of Patrick Bateman (played by Michael Kremko wearing a face mask), briefly shown in a flashback. The film was denounced by American Psycho author Bret Easton Ellis. In 2005, Kunis expressed embarrassment over the film, and spoke out against the idea of a sequel.

In popular culture 
Finnish melodic death metal band Children of Bodom used the film's ending monologue "My pain is constant and sharp and I do not hope for a better world for anyone" as a segue between two songs on their 2003 album Hate Crew Deathroll.

The film's influence can be seen in Kanye West's music video "Love Lockdown" and Maroon 5's music video "Animals".

In 2013, FX and Lionsgate were developing an American Psycho television series that would have served as a sequel to the film. It was to be set in the present, with Patrick Bateman in his 50s, grooming an apprentice (Andrew Low) to be just like him. As of 2022 it is presumed to have been cancelled or in development hell.

The character Bateman mistakenly attributes a quote by Edmund Kemper to Ed Gein, which has led to it being mistaken as such by others; Bateman says: "You know what Ed Gein said about women? ... He said 'When I see a pretty girl walking down the street, I think two things. One part of me wants to take her out, talk to her, be real nice and sweet and treat her right ... [the other part wonders] what her head would look like on a stick'".

Funny or Die recreated the "Hip to be Square" scene with Huey Lewis in the Bateman role and "Weird Al" Yankovic in the Allen role. In the scene, Lewis discusses the artistic merits of the film American Psycho and shows the actual scene. It ends with Lewis killing Yankovic saying "Try parodying one of my songs now, you stupid bastard!" The video then plays "I Want a New Duck", Yankovic's parody of the Huey Lewis and the News song "I Want a New Drug".

American metalcore band Ice Nine Kills wrote a song based on the film for their 2021 album The Silver Scream 2: Welcome To Horrorwood called "Hip To Be Scared" and features Papa Roach vocalist Jacoby Shaddix.

The film is frequently a topic of memes and has been said by some to be relevant due to its themes and satirical nature.

Notes

References

Citations

Works cited

External links

 
 
 
 
 
 
 
 Am.Psycho2000 e-mails
 Bret Easton Ellis talks film adaptations at SCAD

2000 horror films
2000s crime comedy-drama films
2000s American films
American business films
American crime comedy-drama films
American horror thriller films
American Psycho
American satirical films
American serial killer films
2000 black comedy films
2000s serial killer films
BDSM in films
2000s English-language films
English-language Canadian films
Fiction with unreliable narrators
Films about the upper class
Films about businesspeople
Films about cannibalism
Films about narcissism
Films about rape in the United States
Films based on American horror novels
Films based on works by Bret Easton Ellis
Films directed by Mary Harron
Films scored by John Cale
Films set in apartment buildings
Films set in New York City
Films set in 1987
Films shot in New York City
Films shot in Toronto
Lionsgate films
Wall Street films
Columbia Pictures films
2000 drama films
2000 films
Postmodern films
Films set in the 1980s
American psychological horror films
Canadian crime comedy-drama films
Canadian horror thriller films
Canadian satirical films
Canadian serial killer films
Canadian psychological horror films
Necrophilia in film
Film and television memes
2000 independent films
American independent films
Film controversies
Film controversies in the United States
Obscenity controversies in film
2000s Canadian films
Crimes against sex workers in fiction